Alvis Newman "Tex" Shirley (April 25, 1918 – November 7, 1993) was an American professional baseball pitcher. He played in Major League Baseball (MLB) from 1941 to 1946 for the Philadelphia Athletics and St. Louis Browns.

External links

1918 births
1993 deaths
Abbeville A's players
Baseball players from Texas
Buffalo Bisons (minor league) players
Clovis Pioneers players
Dallas Eagles players
Drummondville Cubs players
Granby Red Sox players
Jersey City Giants players
Major League Baseball pitchers
Paris Rockets players
People from DeSoto, Texas
People from Hopkins County, Texas
Philadelphia Athletics players
St. Louis Browns players
Springfield Rifles players
Toledo Mud Hens players
Wilmington Blue Rocks (1940–1952) players